Brookville High School is a high school in Campbell County, Virginia, United States.

The school was founded in 1926 with the first elementary classes beginning in November. The first high school classes began in 1927 with 2 teachers, and the first graduating class was 1930, with three graduates. The last graduating high school class from the original school was in 1966. The old building was eventually torn down in March, 1978 due to annexation. The current building was completed in 1969 and is now located on Laxton Road, on what is now the boundary between Campbell County and the city of Lynchburg. The Brookville attendance area is served by four schools: Tomahawk Elementary, Leesville Road Elementary, Brookville Middle, and Brookville High.  Brookville High School has been accredited with the Southern Association of Colleges and Schools since 1973.

Athletics 
As of November 2015, Brookville High School holds the following state division championship titles:

Baseball
1973 AA Champions
1987 AA Champions
 2012 AA Runners-up

Football
1973 AA Runners-up
1988 AA Division 4 Runners-up
1996 AA Division 3 Runners-up
1999 AA Division 3 Champions
2008 AA Division 3 Runners-up
2011 AA Division 3 Champions
2012 AA Division 3 Champions

Boys golf
1993 AA Champions
2008 AA Champions

Boys indoor track
1980 AA Champions
2007 AA Champions

Wrestling
1976 AA Champions
2011 AA Runners-Up
2012 AA Runners-Up

Girls softball
2014 AA Champions
2015 AA Champions

Marching Band
2016 Group 1 State Champions

Notable alumni

Jerry Falwell, Founder of Thomas Road Baptist Church and Liberty University
Anthony Clark, Actor from Yes, Dear, Comedian
Brandon Inge, Former MLB player Oakland Athletics, Detroit Tigers
Phil Leftwich, Former MLB player  California Angels) 
Phil Vassar, Country music star
Gina St. John, Radio and television personality
Logan Thomas, Former Virginia Tech Quarterback, Currently playing Tight End for the Washington Commanders
Korren Kirven, Former University of Alabama Offensive Line, Currently playing Offensive Tackle for the Tampa Bay Buccaneers
Deshon Foxx, Former University of Connecticut, Former Wide Receiver for the New York Jets
Mike Barr, Former Rutgers University Punter, Former Punter for the Arizona Cardinals
Carolyn Martin, President, Amherst College

References

External links
 Editing Brookville High School (Virginia) - High School Apparel
 Official website

Public high schools in Virginia
Schools in Campbell County, Virginia